Daniel "Dani" Cancela Rodríguez (born 23 September 1981) is a former professional footballer who played as a left-back. 

Born in Spain, he spent most of his career with Kitchee in Hong Kong after signing in 2010, eventually going on to represent the Hong Kong national team.

Club career

Spain
Born in A Coruña, Galicia, Cancela played several years for Deportivo de La Coruña, but only appeared officially for the reserves where he spent five seasons, four in the Tercera División. He was also loaned to amateurs Malpica SDC during his contract.

After leaving the Estadio Riazor in 2006, Cancela moved to the Segunda División B, competing two seasons apiece with CF Fuenlabrada and CD Lugo.

Hong Kong
Cancela signed for Kitchee SC in Hong Kong on 26 July 2010, alongside compatriots Fernando Recio and Jordi Tarrés. On 28 January of the following year, he renewed his contract for another two years.

On 19 August 2022, after a match against BG Pathum United F.C. in the round of 16 of the AFC Champions League, Cancela announced his retirement at the age of 40. He made 250 competitive appearances during his spell at the Mong Kok Stadium, winning several honours including eight Premier Leagues.

International career
Cancela received his Hong Kong passport in October 2017, at the age of 36. He made his debut for the national team on 5 October, in a 4–0 friendly win over Laos.

Career statistics

Club

International

Honours
Kitchee
Hong Kong Premier League: 2014–15, 2016–17, 2017–18, 2019–20, 2020–21
Hong Kong First Division: 2010–11, 2011–12, 2013–14
Hong Kong Senior Shield: 2016–17, 2018–19
Hong Kong FA Cup: 2011–12, 2012–13, 2014–15, 2016–17, 2017–18, 2018–19
Hong Kong Sapling Cup: 2017–18, 2019–20
Hong Kong League Cup: 2011–12, 2014–15, 2015–16

References

External links

1981 births
Living people
Spanish emigrants to Hong Kong
Spanish footballers
Hong Kong footballers
Footballers from A Coruña
Naturalized footballers of Hong Kong
Association football defenders
Segunda División B players
Tercera División players
Deportivo Fabril players
CF Fuenlabrada footballers
CD Lugo players
Hong Kong First Division League players
Hong Kong Premier League players
Kitchee SC players
Hong Kong League XI representative players
Hong Kong international footballers
Spanish expatriate footballers
Expatriate footballers in Hong Kong
Spanish expatriate sportspeople in Hong Kong